Strategic Command: European Theater is a turn based strategy game set in World War II. It allows you to play the Allies or the Axis. The smaller European nations can go either way depending on how the Axis or Allies act towards them. Although on historical mode some nations join the allies or axis by default while others depend on the course of the war and aggression of the major powers.

The game runs from 1939 till 1947 where unless you control the world the war ends. The game also features 6 major campaigns:  
 Fall Weiss (invasion of Poland)
 Fall Gelb (invasion of France)
 Operation Barbarossa (German invasion of the USSR launched from occupied Poland)
 Fall Blau (German advances towards Stalingrad) 
 Zitadelle (Soviet counterattack on the eastern front) 
 Overlord (the allied invasion of Europe)

Reception 

The game received "average" reviews according to the review aggregation website Metacritic.

References

External links 
 Battlefront website
 

2002 video games
Battlefront.com games
Turn-based strategy video games
Windows games
Windows-only games
World War II video games
Computer wargames
Video games developed in Canada